Dhule Airport  is located at Gondur area in Dhule, Maharashtra, India. 
This airstrip was constructed in 1974 by the Public Works Department and was transferred to the Maharashtra Airport Development Company (MADC) after its formation in 2002.
The Bombay Flying Club leased the airstrip from the MADC and shifted its training operations here in 2009 to avoid the congested air-space of Mumbai.

Night landing facility is now available with runway lights and an ATC tower. Commercial operations will be starting soon in the coming future. Frequency in use 123.45 MHz

References

Airports in Maharashtra
Dhule
Airports established in 1974
1974 establishments in Maharashtra
20th-century architecture in India